WiGig, alternatively known as 60 GHz Wi-Fi, refers to a set of 60 GHz wireless network protocols. It includes the current IEEE 802.11ad standard and also the IEEE 802.11ay standard.

The WiGig specification allows devices to communicate without wires at multi-gigabit speeds. It enables high performance wireless data, display and audio applications that supplement the capabilities of previous wireless LAN devices. WiGig tri-band-enabled devices, which operate in the 2.4, 5 and 60 GHz bands, deliver data transfer rates up to 7 Gbit/s (for 11ad), about as fast as an 8-band 802.11ac transmission, and more than eleven times as fast than the highest 802.11n rate, while maintaining compatibility with existing Wi-Fi devices. The 60 GHz millimeter wave signal cannot typically penetrate walls but can propagate by reflection from walls, ceilings, floors and objects using beamforming built into the WiGig system. When roaming away from the main room, the protocol can switch to make use of the other lower bands at a much lower rate, both of which can propagate through walls.

802.11ay has a transmission rate of 20–40 Gbit/s and an extended transmission distance of 300–500 meters. 802.11ay should not be confused with the similarly named 802.11ax that was released in 2019. The 802.11ay standard is designed to run at much higher frequencies. The lower frequency of 802.11ax enables it to penetrate walls, something that the 11ay standard struggles to do. Although they boast similar speeds, thanks to much more spectrum, 802.11ay can achieve much higher speeds: 277 Gb/s vs. ~3.6Gbit/s (4 streams: 2x 160Mhz @ 1.2Gbit/s + 2x 80Mhz @ 0.6Gbit/s).

The name WiGig comes from Wireless Gigabit Alliance, the original association being formed to promote the adoption of IEEE 802.11ad. However, it is now certified by Wi-Fi Alliance.

History 
 In May 2009, formation of Wireless Gigabit Alliance was announced to promote the IEEE 802.11ad protocol.
 In December 2009, The completed version 1.0 WiGig specification was announced.
In May 2010, WiGig Alliance announced the publication of its specification, the opening of its Adopter Program, and the liaison agreement with the Wi-Fi Alliance to cooperate on the expansion of Wi-Fi technologies.
 In June 2011, WiGig announced the release of its certification-ready version 1.1 specification.
 In December 2012, the IEEE Standards Association published IEEE 802.11ad-2012 as an amendment to the overall IEEE 802.11 standard family.
 In 2016, Wi-Fi Alliance launched certification program for WiGig products.
 The second generation WiGig standard, IEEE 802.11ay, was published on July 28, 2021.

Specification 

The WiGig MAC and PHY Specification, version 1.1 includes the following capabilities:
Supports data transmission rates up to 7 Gbit/s – a bit over eleven times as fast as the highest 802.11n rate
Supplements and extends the 802.11 Media Access Control (MAC) layer and is backward compatible with the IEEE 802.11 standard
Physical layer enables low power and high performance WiGig devices, guaranteeing interoperability and communication at gigabit per second rates
Protocol adaptation layers are being developed to support specific system interfaces including data buses for PC peripherals and display interfaces for HDTVs, monitors and projectors
Support for beamforming, enabling robust communication at up to 10 meters. The beams can move within the coverage area through modification of the transmission phase of individual antenna elements, which is called phased array antenna beamforming.
Widely used advanced security and power management for WiGig devices

Applications 

On November 3, 2010, WiGig Alliance announced the WiGig version 1.0 A/V and I/O protocol adaptation layer (PAL) specifications. The application specifications have been developed to support specific system interfaces including extensions for PC peripherals and display interfaces for HDTVs, monitors and projectors.

WiGig Display Extension
Supports wireless transmission of audio/visual data
Enables wireless DisplayPort and other display interfaces that include the High-bandwidth Digital Content Protection 2.0 feature.
Offers key A/V applications, such as the transmission of lightly compressed or uncompressed video from a computer or digital camera to an HDTV, monitor or projector

WiGig Bus Extension and WiGig Serial Extension. The WiGig Bus Extension (WBE) was available to members in 2011.
Define high-performance wireless implementations of widely used computer interfaces over 60 GHz
Enable multi-gigabit wireless connectivity between any two devices, such as connection to storage and other high-speed peripherals

Competition 
WiGig competes with other 60 GHz frequency band transmission standards like WirelessHD in some applications.

Channels 

Regional spectrum allocations vary by region limiting the available number of channels in some regions. So far, the US is the only region supporting all six channels while other regions are considering to follow suit.

Single-carrier and Control-PHY data rates

OFDM data rates

Low-power single-carrier data rates

See also 
IEEE 802.11ad
IEEE 802.11ay
IEEE 802.11aj
Gi-Fi
Bluetooth
IEEE 802.15
Media Agnostic USB
Ultra-wideband (UWB)
 Wireless HDMI:
 WiDi version 3.5 to 6.0 supports Miracast;  discontinued
 Miracast (wireless display technology)
 WirelessHD
 Wireless Home Digital Interface (WHDI)
Wireless USB
Zigbee
LTE-WLAN Aggregation

 Wi-Fi Direct
ip based:
 Chromecast (proprietary media broadcast over ip: Google Cast for audio or audiovisual playback)
 AirPlay (proprietary ip based)
 Digital Living Network Alliance (DLNA) (ip based)
port / cable standard for mobile equipment
 Mobile High-Definition Link - MHL
 SlimPort (Mobility DisplayPort), also known as MyDP

References 

Wireless networking standards
IEEE standards